Greater Noida Omicron is the residential sector of Greater Noida. Omicron is the latest sector to be included in Greater Noida after Alpha, Beta, Gamma sectors . Spread in over 2.7 square kilometers, Omicron sector is divided in three sectors Omicron I, Omicron II and Omicron III. Originally part of Bilaspur, Gautam Buddh Nagar district of Uttar Pradesh.
This sector comprises Plots, Housing Societies allocated by Greater Noida Authority, Private developers flats like Gaur Atulyam, Supertech Czar, Saya Zion and Eldeco Mystic Greens.
Allocation of Housing flats by authority scheme got into trouble when farmers filed case in Allahabad High Court for higher compensation.

Sectors in Omicron

Omicron 2 
Omicron 2 has a total area of 650103.84 sqm without peripheral road, out of this the 146575.15 is green zone(~22.55%). This sector was offered as built-up houses in the BHS-06 scheme. On the South-West side of the sector lies the Sector-37, on North-East side is the Sector Mu-1. The road between Omicron-2 and Sector-37 is 130 m wide. Other 3 side peripheral roads are 60 m wide. The detail of plots in the sector are as below:

References

Neighbourhoods in Noida